The Treaty of Corbeil may refer to :

 The Treaty of Corbeil (1258) between France and Aragon
 The Treaty of Corbeil (1326) between France and Scotland